"Help Me" is the debut solo single by American singer Nick Carter. It was written by Matthew Gerrard and M. Vice for Carter's first studio album, Now or Never. "Help Me" was released on June 24, 2002 and reached the top 10 in Canada, Denmark, and Italy.

Track listings and formats
 Maxi CD single
 "Help Me" (Album Version) – 3:11
 "Help Me" (Instrumental) – 3:11
 "End of Forever"  – 4:10
 "Payback"  – 3:30
 EU CD 1
 "Help Me" (Album Version) – 3:11
 "Help Me" (Instrumental) – 3:11

 EU cassette
 "Help Me" (Album Version) – 3:11
 "End of Forever"  – 4:10
 "Help Me" (Instrumental) – 3:11
 EU CD 2
 "Help Me" (Album Version) – 3:11
 "End of Forever"  – 4:10
 "Payback"  – 3:30

Charts

Weekly charts

Year-end charts

Release history

References

External links
 "Help Me" music video at Vevo

2002 songs
2002 debut singles
Nick Carter (musician) songs
Jive Records singles
Songs written by Matthew Gerrard
UK Independent Singles Chart number-one singles